This contains lists of countries by uranium production. The first two lists are compiled by the World Nuclear Association, and measures uranium production by tonnes mined. The last list is compiled by TradeTech, a consulting company which specializes in the nuclear fuel market.

World Nuclear Association (2021)

World Nuclear Association (2018)

TradeTech (2011)

See also 

List of countries by uranium reserves
Uranium mining by country
List of uranium projects

References

Lists of countries by mineral production
Production by country